Under the Shadow of the Law is a 1913 American drama film featuring Harry Carey.

Cast
 Harry Carey as The Convict
 Charles West as John Haywood, a Clerk
 Claire McDowell as John Haywood's Sister
 Lionel Barrymore as Charles Darnton, the Employer
 Walter Miller as The Bookkeeper
 Kate Toncray as The Mother
 John T. Dillon as The Doctor
 Nan Christy as A Nurse

See also
 Harry Carey filmography
 Lionel Barrymore Filmography

External links

1913 films
1913 short films
1913 drama films
Silent American drama films
American silent short films
American black-and-white films
Films directed by Anthony O'Sullivan
1910s American films